Oldhamia is an ichnogenus describing burrows produced by worm-like organisms mining underneath microbial mats. It was common from the Early Cambrian deep-water deposits.

The Ediacaran species Oldhamia recta are body fossils of a rod-like organism, rather than ichnofossils.

The Ordovician Oldhamia pinnata and Carboniferous-Permian Oldhamia fimbriata were mentioned without any ichnotaxonomical formalization, and therefore are nomina nuda.

It was named after the geologist Thomas Oldham.

See also
List of Ediacaran genera

References

Burrow fossils
Fortunian